Neon Repairman is the ninth studio album by singer-songwriter Freedy Johnston, as well as his first self-produced album. It was released in 2015 on Singing Magnet Records. Robbie Fulks wrote that on the album, "The music is played with hearts out and dicks in, to coin a phrase that I sincerely hope does not catch on." Peter Gerstenzang of City Pages called the album "another stunning collection brimming with both indelible melodies and wonderfully seedy characters."

Track listing
All songs written by Freedy Johnston.
"Neon Repairman" – 5:00
"Baby, Baby Come Home" – 4:27
"TV in My Arms" – 3:07
"Summer Clothes" – 4:21
"By the Broke Streetlight" – 2:27
"The First to Leave the World, Is the First to See the World" – 3:51
"Angeline" – 3:53
"The Sentimental Heart" – 3:13
"Her Hair is Blowing in the Wind of Another Planet" – 4:04
"A Little Bit of Somethin' Wrong" – 4:18

Personnel
Freedy Johnston – vocals, instruments
John Calarco – drums
David Raven – drums
Chris Boeger – bass
Dusty Wakeman – bass
Chris Lawrence – guitar, pedal steel
Doug Pettibone – guitar
Jim Chapdelaine – guitar
Dave Adler – mellotron, rhodes
James Cowan – bongos, percussion
Biff Blumfungagnge – violin
Mary Gaines – cello

References

2015 albums
Freedy Johnston albums